Marcus Lollius Paullinus Decimus Valerius Asiaticus Saturninus (69/70 – after 134) was a prominent Roman Senator who was a powerful figure in the second half of the 1st century and first half of the 2nd century. He is also known by the shorter form of his name, Decimus Valerius Asiaticus.

Family background and early life
Saturninus was of Allobrogian and Roman ancestry. He was the son of Decimus Valerius Asiaticus and Vitellia the daughter of the emperor Vitellius from his wife Galeria Fundana. His father served as a Legatus of Gallia Belgica, and later became the governor of that province in the reign of the emperor Nero. The father of Saturninus became powerful through wealth and the skilful exploitation of imperial patronage.

The family of his father were originally from Vienna, Gallia Narbonensis. Saturninus was the grandson of the consul Decimus Valerius Asiaticus and his wife Lollia Saturnina, whose younger sister Lollia Paulina was the third wife of the emperor Caligula. Saturninus was a grandson of Decimus Valerius Asiaticus and Lollia Saturnina. The name of Saturninus reveals paternally he is related to the Valeria, and Lollia gens.

Despite the presence of Lollii Paulini on his mother's side, Olli Salomies argues that "surely the collocation of his names points to the conclusion that they are due to a (testamentary) adoption; the adopting parent may, of course, well have been a relative of the grandmother, since ... adoptive sons and fathers were in fact often closely related."

When Vespasian became emperor in second half of 69, Asiaticus was designated consul in 70; however, he died early that year before he could enter his consulship. Asiaticus was survived by Vitellia and their son. Later in 70, Vespasian arranged for Vitellia to remarry another unnamed man. Her second marriage was a splendid match for her and Vespasian provided for her, the dowry and clothing. Although he was born in Vienna, Saturninus was raised in Rome; otherwise little is known about his early life.

Political career
An inscription from Tivoli provides details for the earlier part of his cursus honorum. Saturninus started his career in the reign of the emperor Domitian, as one of the tresviri monetalis, the most prestigious of the four boards that comprise the vigintiviri; assignment to this board was usually allocated to patricians or individuals favored by the emperor. The next honors listed on the inscription are membership in the Salii Collinus and election as one of the Pontiffs, which apparently happened when he was in his twenties. Then at the age of 25, he held the post of quaestor, being selected as one of the pair allocated to attend to the emperor; the duties of these quaestors included reading the Emperor's speeches to the Senate. The inscription breaks off where it mentions his appointment as praetor, which usually happened at the age of 30. 

We can supply details of the later part of his career from other sources. One attests to Saturninus serving as a suffect consul for the nundinium of May-August 94. Another reports that Saturninus was proconsular governor of Asia for the term 108/109. Werner Eck reports an unpublished inscription from Africa indicates he was governor of Hispania Tarraconensis at some point during the reign of Hadrian. From the years 124 to 134, he served as a Praefectus urbi in Rome. In 125, he held the fasces again, this time as consul ordinarius. During his political career in the first half of the second century, he was friends with the emperors Trajan and Hadrian.

Marriage and issue
Saturninus married Valeria Catulla Messallina who came from a family of consular rank. Messallina bore Asiaticus a son called Decimus Valerius Taurus Catullus Messallinus Asiaticus.

References

Sources
Epilogue: The Fall of the Vitellii - Vitellia?, daughter
Prosopographia Imperii Romani, L 320 
E.M. Wightman, Gallia Belgica, University of California Press, 1985
Flavius Josephus, Death of an Emperor, University of Exeter Press, 1991
A.K. Bowman, E. Champlin & A. Lintott, The Cambridge Ancient History, Volume 10, Cambridge University Press, 1996
 Biographischer Index der Antike  (Google eBook), Walter de Gruyter, 2001
 B. Jones, The Emperor Domitian (Google eBook), Routledge, 2002
Gwynn Morgan, 69 AD: The Year of Four Emperors, Oxford University Press, 2005
M.B. Skinner, A Companion to Catullus (Google eBook), John Wiley & Sons, 2010
A. Freisenbruch, The First Ladies of Rome: The Women Behind the Caesars (Google eBook), Random House, 2011

1st-century Romans
2nd-century Romans
1st-century clergy
2nd-century clergy
1st-century births
2nd-century deaths
Year of birth uncertain
Year of death unknown
Priests of the Roman Empire
Imperial Roman consuls
Roman governors of Asia
Urban prefects of Rome
Roman governors of Hispania Tarraconensis
Saturninus, Marcus
Valerii
Vitellii
Ancient Roman adoptees